Elcan Durlacher (1817 – 21 December 1889) was a German Hebraist and publisher, best known for his translations of Jewish liturgy into French.

Durlacher was born in Karlsruhe, Germany, in 1817. He went to Paris in 1845 as a teacher of languages, and founded a Hebrew publishing-house, which was continued, after his death, by his son. He compiled a Hebrew reader and an almanac, and wrote a small book entitled Joseph and His Brothers. His two most notable works are a French translation of the German maḥzor, and another of the siddur, which he made with the assistance of L. Wogue, whose edition of the Pentateuch he published.

Publications

References
 

1817 births
1889 deaths
19th-century French Jews
19th-century French translators
French Hebraists
French people of German-Jewish descent
French publishers (people)
German emigrants to France
Jewish translators
Translators from Hebrew
Translators to French